Morphogenesis is an album by American jazz saxophonist Steve Coleman, which was recorded in 2016 and released on Pi Recordings.

Background
The band Natal Eclipse, assembled specifically for the project, includes musicians who have long been in Coleman's circle: trumpeter Jonathan Finlayson, vocalist Jen Shyu, and tenor saxophonist María Grand. They are joined by pianist Matt Mitchell and some musicians who typically perform in a classical music context: clarinetist Rane Moore, violinist Kristin Lee, bassist Greg Chudzik, and percussionist Neeraj Mehta. Most of the compositions are inspired by movements in boxing.

Reception

The Down Beat review by James Hale states, "Morphogenesis sounds like another high point in the leader's ongoing journey to create his own language."

The PopMatters review by Will Layman notes, "The remarkable strength of Steve Coleman's recent work is that he has found a way to make his music more complex, more diverse, and more appealing all at once."

The Point of Departure review by Troy Collins states, "More so than many of his recent efforts, Morphogenesis stands as a key document in the development of Coleman's compositional progress."

Track listing
All Compositions by Steve Coleman
 "Inside Game" – 9:35
 "Pull Counter" – 5:18 
 "Roll Under and Angles" – 4:31
 "NOH" – 4:39
 "Morphing" – 14:08
 "Shoulder Roll" – 5:10
 "SPAN" – 3:45
 "Dancing and Jabbing" – 6:58
 "Horda" – 6:30

Personnel
 Steve Coleman – alto saxophone
 Jonathan Finlayson – trumpet
 Maria Grand – tenor saxophone
 Rane Moore – clarinet
 Kristin Lee – violin
 Jen Shyu – vocals
 Matt Mitchell – piano
 Greg Chudzik – bass
 Neeraj Mehta – percussion on 3,4,6,7,9

References

2017 albums
Steve Coleman albums
Pi Recordings albums